Triangle is a 2007 Hong Kong action film produced and directed by Tsui Hark, Ringo Lam, and Johnnie To. The film's title refers to both the acclaimed trio of filmmakers and to the uneasy brotherhood of the film's three protagonists. Triangle tells one story which is told in three thirty-minute segments, independently helmed by the three directors.  It stars Louis Koo, Simon Yam and Sun Honglei as a group of friends who uncover a hidden treasure that quickly draws attention among others.  The film's tagline is "Temptation. Jealousy. Destiny." Each word is often associated with the segments that appear in chronological order.

The first Hong Kong film made in a frame story format, Triangle had each director take charge of a film segment, bringing in their own production team and screenwriters to continue the story set in motion by the previous director.  Critics made easy notice of the lack of continuity in between each segment, since the trio of directors did not share their scripts together while discussing the concepts.

Triangle was screened out of competition at the 2007 Cannes Film Festival. It was later released in China on 1 October 2007, which was one month before its theatrical Hong Kong release.

Plot

Small-timer Fei (Louis Koo), his married buddy Sam (Simon Yam), and antique store owner Mok (Sun Hong Lei) are all in desperate need of money. Fei wants his friend to drive a robbery getaway car, but Sam backs out, throwing Fei in trouble with the triads. As the three are arguing, a mysterious man leaves them a map, leading them to an unlikely treasure under the Legislative Council building. All their financial woes seem to be solved after a late-night heist, but they are being tracked by shady cop Wen (Gordon Lam), who is carrying on an affair with Sam's emotionally unstable wife, Ling (Kelly Lin), and has connections with Fei. When the twisted relationship tangles come to light, the brotherhood dangerously breaks down and the treasure ends up in the wrong hands.

Cast
Louis Koo as Fei
Simon Yam as Lee Bo-Sam
Sun Honglei as Mok Shing-Yuen
Gordon Lam as Wen
Kelly Lin as Ling
You Yong as Policeman
Lam Suet as Fat Bo

Production
The film was shot entirely in Hong Kong with actors from the city and Mainland China. Each director was solely responsible for one third of the film (about 30-minute long). They did not discuss their segments with each other, and each director had a different set of writers working on each segment, the most notable being Yau Nai-hoi, Au Kin-yee and Yip Tin-shing, frequent scriptwriters for Johnnie To and his Milkyway Image films. All of the segments relied on the same editor, cinematographer and music for the sake of uniformity. David M. Richardson served as an editor, Guy Zerafa provided the film score and Cheng Siu-Keung served as cinematographer. All three worked on To's 2006 film Exiled.

Tsui Hark was the first to start production for the film, since To and Lam agreed that it was his original concept. The initial plan was to shoot Triangle at the end of 2007, but the plan was changed due to the overwhelming positive response from a large number of European distributors. After Tsui completed the first segment of Triangle, Lam looked at the development of it before shooting the second part, and handed the film to Johnnie To who completed the third part with its conclusion.

Festival showings
Triangle was screened out of competition at the 2007 Cannes Film Festival. It was also screened at the Santa Barbara International Film Festival and the Seattle International Film Festival.

References

External links
 
 
 
 
 Milkyway Image Website
 Film Workshop Website
 Media Asia Website

2007 films
2000s Cantonese-language films
Hong Kong action thriller films
Cinema of Hong Kong
Films directed by Tsui Hark
Films directed by Johnnie To
Films directed by Ringo Lam
Milkyway Image films
2007 action films
Films with screenplays by Yau Nai-hoi
Films set in Hong Kong
Films shot in Hong Kong
2000s Hong Kong films